The American rock band Jimmy Eat World has released ten studio albums, twenty-three singles, seven extended plays, three live albums, one compilation album, one video album, and one song on the "various artists" compilation What's Mine Is Yours.

Jimmy Eat World formed in 1993 and released their debut EP, entitled One, Two, Three, Four, in 1994 on Wooden Blue Records; their debut self-titled studio album Jimmy Eat World was released later that year on the same label. The band then signed a record contract with Capitol Records and released Static Prevails in 1996, while also concurrently releasing a series of split 7-inch singles and a cassette with other bands, such as Less Than Jake, Sense Field, and Mineral. In 1999, Jimmy Eat World released their third album Clarity, which peaked at number 47 on the German Albums Chart and number 30 on the Billboard Top Heatseekers chart.

The band's commercial breakthrough occurred in 2001 with the release of several singles from their fourth studio album Bleed American. Four singles from the album charted within the top 20 of the Hot Modern Rock Tracks chart, while "The Middle" and "Sweetness" respectively peaked at number one and number two; "The Middle" also peaked at number 5 on the Billboard Hot 100 chart. Bleed American was certified platinum in Canada and America, and silver in the United Kingdom.

In 2004 Jimmy Eat World released Futures, which was their first album to appear in the top ten of the Billboard 200 chart. Futures featured the single "Pain", a song that was their second number one on the Hot Modern Rock Tracks chart and the only Jimmy Eat World single to be certified gold in the US. The band's sixth album Chase This Light was released in 2007 and became the band's highest-peaking album, as it reached number five on the Billboard 200. Invented was then released in 2010 and this was followed by Damage in 2013.

Albums

Studio albums

Compilation albums

Live albums

Extended plays

Singles

Promotional singles

Split singles

Other charting songs

Video albums

Music videos

Other original appearances 
"Carbon Scoring" – Back from the Dead Motherfucker
"Seventeen" (Unreleased demo) – Never Been Kissed film soundtrack
"Lucky Denver Mint" (Alternate version) – Never Been Kissed compact disc soundtrack
"New Religion" – The Duran Duran Tribute Album
"Opener" – What's Mine Is Yours
"I Love You All the Time (Play It Forward Campaign)" - I Love You All the Time (Play It Forward Campaign) - Single
"My Enemy" – 30 Days, 50 Songs

Notes

References

External links

Jimmy Eat World at MusicBrainz

Rock music group discographies
Discographies of American artists
Punk rock discographies
Discography
Alternative rock discographies